The 2015 Columbus Challenger was a professional tennis tournament played on indoor hard courts. It was the first edition of the tournament which was part of the 2015 ATP Challenger Tour. It took place in Columbus, United States between 21 and 27 September 2015.

Singles main draw entrants

Seeds

 1 Rankings are as of September 14, 2015.

Other entrants

No Wild Cards were distributed for this event.

The following players received entry into the singles main draw courtesy of a protected ranking:
  Dennis Nevolo
  Peter Polansky

The following players received entry from the qualifying draw:
  Hugo Di Feo
  Damon Gooch
  Peter Kobelt
  Dean O'Brien

Champions

Singles

  Dennis Novikov def.  Ryan Harrison, 6–3, 3–6, 6–3

Doubles

   Chase Buchanan /  Blaž Rola def.  Mitchell Krueger /  Eric Quigley, 6–4, 4–6, [19–17]

References

Columbus Challenger